Punctoterebra nitida, common name : the Shiny Pacific Auger,  is a species of sea snail, a marine gastropod mollusk in the family Terebridae, the auger snails.

Description
The size of an adult shell varies between 19 mm and 45 mm.

Distribution
This species is distributed in the Indian Ocean along East Africa and the Aldabra Atoll; in the Western Pacific Ocean.

References

 Taylor, J.D. (1973). Provisional list of the mollusca of Aldabra Atoll.
 Bratcher T. & Cernohorsky W.O. (1987). Living terebras of the world. A monograph of the recent Terebridae of the world. American Malacologists, Melbourne, Florida & Burlington, Massachusetts. 240pp
 Terryn Y. (2007). Terebridae: A Collectors Guide. Conchbooks & NaturalArt. 59pp + plates

External links
 Gaqstropods.com : Strioterebrum nitidum; accessed : 6 May 2011
 Fedosov, A. E.; Malcolm, G.; Terryn, Y.; Gorson, J.; Modica, M. V.; Holford, M.; Puillandre, N. (2020). Phylogenetic classification of the family Terebridae (Neogastropoda: Conoidea). Journal of Molluscan Studies

Terebridae
Gastropods described in 1844